Tetrafluoropropene may refer to:

 1,3,3,3-Tetrafluoropropene (HFO-1234ze)
 2,3,3,3-Tetrafluoropropene (HFO-1234yf)